The Alexander Nevsky Cathedral is a Russian Orthodox cathedral church located at 12 rue Daru in the 8th arrondissement of Paris. It was established and consecrated in 1861, making it the first Russian Orthodox place of worship in France. It is the see of the Patriarchal Exarchate for Orthodox Parishes of Russian Tradition in Western Europe, recently transferred to the jurisdiction of the Patriarchate of Moscow. It was built in part through a gift of 200,000 francs from Tsar Alexander II. Alexander Nevsky Cathedral had not been aligned with the Patriarch of Moscow since the Russian Revolution. But as of 14 September 2019 the jurisdiction of the parish community of the cathedral was transferred to the Patriarchate of Moscow. The cathedral should not be confused with Holy Trinity Orthodox Cathedral, which is a provincial cathedral of the Patriarchal Exarchate in Western Europe (Moscow Patriarchate).
The closest métro station is Courcelles

Associated notable people
Nikolai Aleksandrovich Semashko, the first People's Commissar for Health of Soviet Russia, married Nadezhda Mikhailovna Nelidova (née Sokol’skaia) here on 13 August 1909.
Artist Pablo Picasso married Olga Khokhlova here on 12 July 1918; the witnesses were Jean Cocteau, Max Jacob, and Guillaume Apollinaire. 
Henri Troyat made his first marriage here in 1938.
Vladimir Kramnik married here in 2006. He is the former world chess champion. 
The funerals of several noted Russian artists, writers, and other cultural figures were held here: Ivan Turgenev in 1883, Fyodor Chaliapin in 1938, Wassily Kandinsky in 1944, George Gurdjieff in 1949, Ivan Bunin in 1953, Andrei Tarkovsky in 1987, and Henri Troyat in 2007.
Alexander Schmemann, noted Russian theologian and writer, and future dean of St. Vladimir's Orthodox Theological Seminary (1962-1983) in New York, served here in the 1930s as an altar boy and sub-deacon.
Vassily Voskresensky aka Colonel Wassily de Basil, impresario of the Ballets Russes de Monte Carlo (and its iterations) was buried here in 1951.

Representation in other media
The 1956 film Anastasia, about one of the daughters of the imperial Romanov family, features the Cathedral in one of its first scenes.

Gallery

Bibliography
 Nicolas Ross, Saint-Alexandre sur-Seine, édition du CERF.

References

Eastern Orthodox church buildings in Paris
Archdiocese of Russian Orthodox churches in Western Europe
1861 establishments in France
Religious organizations established in 1861
Buildings and structures in the 8th arrondissement of Paris
Russian Orthodox cathedrals in France
Byzantine Revival architecture in France
Paris
Cathedrals in Paris
19th-century Eastern Orthodox church buildings
19th-century churches in France